Vampire: The Masquerade is a tabletop role-playing game in the World of Darkness series, in which players take the roles of vampires. It was originally released by White Wolf Publishing in 1991, and with new editions released in 1992 (second edition), 1998 (Revised Edition), 2011 (20th Anniversary Edition), and 2018 (fifth edition), each of which updated the game rules. These have been supported with supplementary game books, expanding the game mechanics and setting.

The books from the game's original run were mostly published by White Wolf Publishing, sometimes under their imprint Black Dog Game Factory for books considered more adult. Supplements for the 20th Anniversary Edition were published by Onyx Path Publishing, a company formed by ex–White Wolf Publishing staff; books for the fifth edition are published by Renegade Game Studios together with series owner Paradox Interactive, and by collaborators including Modiphius Entertainment and Onyx Path Publishing.

The supplements include the By Night series, each covering a city as portrayed in the setting; the Clanbook series, covering the vampire clans; guides to the game; sourcebooks for sects and factions; and various other books. The supplements often introduce gradual change to the game's setting, advancing the overarching narrative. Adventure modules have been released, but only rarely, as White Wolf Publishing has preferred to let storytellers construct their own adventures, an uncommon choice in tabletop role-playing games that they could afford due to the World of Darkness series' success and longevity. In the mid-1990s, new World of Darkness books were often top sellers, and by 2001, Vampire: The Masquerade was the second best selling tabletop role-playing game after TSR, Inc.'s Dungeons & Dragons.

Books

First edition (1991–1992)

Second edition (1992–1998)

Revised Edition (1998–2004 and 2011)

20th Anniversary Edition (2011–2018)

Fifth edition (2018–present)

Compilations

Notes

References

External links
 Official World of Darkness tabletop games website

Vampire: The Masquerade
Vampire: The Masquerade
Vampire: The Masquerade